Badminton at the 1993 East Asian Games was held at Shanghai, China in the month of May. It was the first time sport of Badminton was included at the East Asian Games competition. Competitions for five individual disciplines as well as for teams were conducted. In individual competition, China dominated by winning four out of five gold medals while South Korea won a single gold in the women's doubles discipline. In team competition, Chinese team secured both the Gold medals in Men's and Women's events.

Medal summary

Medal table

Medalists

Results

Men's singles

Women's singles

Men's doubles

Women's doubles

Mixed doubles

References 

Badminton at the East Asian Games
1993 in badminton
1993 in Chinese sport
Badminton in China
International sports competitions hosted by China